'The Columbia Singles Collection, Vol. 1' is a compilation album of songs recorded by American singer Jo Stafford during her time at Columbia Records. This album was released by Corinthian Records, the company founded by Stafford and her husband, Paul Weston, on February 17, 2004.

Track listing

 Blackout the Moon		 	
 "Love Is Here to Stay"		 	
 Handsome Stranger		 	
 Someone's Been Readin My Mail		 	
 "Suddenly There's a Valley" - 1955	 	
 Smoking My Sad Cigarette		 	
 The Dixieland Band		 	
 A Perfect Love		 	
 "Indoor Sport" - 1960		 	
 Use Your Imagination		 	
 Lovely Is the Evening	 	
 How Can We Say Goodbye		 	
 Big D		 	
 Once to Every Heart		 	
 "I'll Be There" - 1957	 	
 "Wouldn't It Be Loverly"		 	
 Along the Colorado Trail		 	
 I Got a Sweetie		 	
 Goodnight Pillow		 	
 Hawaiian War Chant		 	
 Just Another Polka		 	
 Bells Are Ringing		 	
 "All Yours"	- 1959 	 	
 It's Never Quite the Same		 	
 "I'm in the Mood for Love"

References

2004 compilation albums
Jo Stafford compilation albums
Corinthian Records compilation albums